Jiří Rychlík (born 24 November 1977) is a Czech footballer. He currently plays for Bohemians 1905.

External links
 Profile at iDNES.cz

1977 births
Living people
Czech footballers
Association football defenders
Czech First League players
Sportspeople from Příbram
Bohemians 1905 players
1. FK Příbram players
MFK Ružomberok players
FK Mladá Boleslav players
SK Slavia Prague players